Atar (Berber for mountain) is a town in northwestern Mauritania, the capital of the Adrar Region and the main settlement on the Adrar Plateau. Situated on the oued Seguellil, it is home to an airport, a museum and a historic mosque, constructed in 1674. In 2013 it had a population of 25,190.

Geology and geography
The Adrar's mountains are from the primary era against the precambrian Tiris Zemmour. Near Atar, you can find stromatolites. In the North, you can find Choum with the train that comes from Nouadhibou and goes to Zouerate. East of Atar, through Amojjar Pass, is the difficult way to Chinguetti, Ouadane and the astonishing Richat Structure.

Climate

Atar has a hot desert climate (Köppen climate classification BWh) typical of the Sahara Desert, south of the tropic of Cancer. The weather is usually very hot, very sunny and very dry but it can be overcast sometimes. The annual average temperature is close to 30 °C (86 °F), meaning that excessive heat persists year-round. The annual mean rainfall amount is very low, averaging no more than 35 mm and it mainly falls in August and in September while the sunshine duration is high, at over 3,540 h of bright sunshine yearly.

Tourism

Today, the Atar is best known to outsiders as an entryway for tourists to visit the ruins of the ancient Moorish cities of Ouadane and Chinguetti. It was a key stop in the world's longest off-road race, the Paris Dakar Rally, held every January.

Small business sector
The "samaras" (from Arab smela : sole) are made in Atar and well known in Mauritania. It's a leather sole with straps.

Military

In 2012, an air force school was founded in Atar to train pilots and crew for the Military of Mauritania.

Notable people
Med Hondo - film director  (1936-2019)
Maaouya Ould Sid'Ahmed Taya - 5th President of Mauritania (born 1941)

References

External links

Regional capitals in Mauritania
Communes of Adrar Region